The Battle of Messana in 264 BC was the first military clash between the Roman Republic and Carthage. It marked the start of the First Punic War. In that period, and after the recent successes in southern Italy, Sicily became of increasing strategic importance to Rome.

Background
The Greek historian Polybius states in Book One of The Histories: "Even after long consideration, the (Roman) Senate did not approve the proposal to send help to Messana; they took the view that any advantage which would result from relieving the place would be counterbalanced by the inconsistency of such an action. However, the people who had suffered grievously from the wars that had just ended and were in dire need of rehabilitation of every kind, were inclined to listen to the consuls. These men, besides stressing the national advantages Rome could secure if she intervened, also dwelt on the great gains which would clearly accrue to every individual citizen from the spoils of war, and so a resolution for sending help was carried. When his decree had been passed by the people, one of the consuls, Appius Claudius, was appointed to command an expedition, and was given orders to cross to Messana."

After this, the Mamertines forced the Punic garrison out of Messana and invited the Roman force into the city. The Carthaginians crucified the garrison commander, Hanno (not the son of Hannibal), on his return to Carthage for what was regarded as his cowardice and lack of judgement in leaving Messana.

Battle

The Romans quickly defeated the Syracusans, then moved against the Carthaginians. The light infantry skirmished but soon fell back. The Roman and Carthaginian infantry engaged in the centre, while the cavalry fought on the flanks. However, the Romans gained the upper hand, and the Carthaginians retreated.

See also
 Not to be confused with the Battle of Messene (397 BC), part of the Greek-Punic Wars.
 Mamertines
 Syracuse, Sicily

References

External links
The General History of Polybius by Polybius, translator James Hampton.

Messana
Messana
Messana
Messana
Messana
Messana
Messana